Vangsvik Chapel is a parish church of the Church of Norway in Senja Municipality in Troms og Finnmark county, Norway. It is located in the village of Vangsvik. It is one of the churches for the Tranøy parish which is part of the Senja prosti (deanery) in the Diocese of Nord-Hålogaland. The concrete church was built in a fan-shaped design in 1975 using plans drawn up by the architect Alf Apalseth. The church seats about 150 people.

See also
List of churches in Nord-Hålogaland

References

Senja
Churches in Troms
20th-century Church of Norway church buildings
Churches completed in 1975
1975 establishments in Norway
Fan-shaped churches in Norway
Concrete churches in Norway